Jairo de Macedo da Silva (born 6 May 1992), or simply Jairo, is a Brazilian professional footballer who plays as a forward for Cypriot First Division club Pafos.

Club career

Jairo started off career in the Brazilian club Botafogo. He came to AS Trenčín in winter 2014, and he signed one-year contract. Jairo came to Trenčín from Brazilian Madureira. The club started to scout him during Copa Amsterdam, where he was playing for Botafogo. In the beginning of 2015, he signed a three-year contract with Trenčín. In the 2nd qualifying round of the UEFA Champions League against Steaua Bucharest, he assisted with all three goals in a 3–2 away win.

On 8 August 2015, PAOK announced the signing of Jairo from AS Trenčín for a reported fee of €400,000. Jairo put pen to paper on a four-year contract. On 3 December 2015, in a 6–2 away win against Chania for Greek Cup he scored his first goal with the club. On 10 January 2016, he scored his first league goal with the club in a 3–1 home win game against PAS Giannina.

On 30 August 2016, he signed with PAS Giannina on a year-long loan from PAOK. On 8 August 2017, he was loaned to Sheriff Tiraspol, signing an 1-year contract. On 23 September 2017, his hat-trick in a 6–3 home win against Dacia helped his club to keep the 1st place in the league.

Jairo joined Croatian side Hajduk Split for the 2018–19 Croatian First Football League season, collecting 13 goals and 10 assists in all competitions. At the end of the season, he was named in the league Team of the Season. On 12 June 2019, Jairo extended his contract for a further three years.

Career statistics

Honours 
AS Trenčín
Slovak Super Liga: 2014–15
Slovak Cup: 2014–15

References

External links

Esporte Profile

1992 births
Living people
Association football forwards
Brazilian footballers
Brazilian expatriate footballers
Madureira Esporte Clube players
Botafogo de Futebol e Regatas players
AS Trenčín players
PAOK FC players
PAS Giannina F.C. players
FC Sheriff Tiraspol players
HNK Hajduk Split players
Pafos FC players
Slovak Super Liga players
Super League Greece players
Moldovan Super Liga players
Croatian Football League players
Cypriot First Division players
Expatriate footballers in Slovakia
Expatriate footballers in Greece
Expatriate footballers in Moldova
Expatriate footballers in Croatia
Expatriate footballers in Cyprus
Brazilian expatriate sportspeople in Slovakia
Brazilian expatriate sportspeople in Greece
Brazilian expatriate sportspeople in Moldova
Brazilian expatriate sportspeople in Croatia
Brazilian expatriate sportspeople in Cyprus
Footballers from Rio de Janeiro (city)